The Château de Duras (Castle of Duras) in Duras, a half hour walk to the north of Sint-Truiden in Belgium, is built in the  Classical style .

This Belgian castle was built between 1787 and 1789 and is located in a beautiful area. The castle was built on the location of the original castle of the Counts of Duras, which was built in 1102. The castle grounds cover an area of more than 100 ha, consisting of woods,  meadows, fields and orchards. It also includes a watermill and a farm.  It is now a protected monument.

Architecture 
The castle was built by the van der Noot family, which includes Henry van der Noot, one of the main landowners in Brabant. Taking place during the time of the French Revolution,  the construction of such a landmark was an expensive and risky undertaking. The Dinant architect, G. Henry designed the facade and outbuildings. A striking feature of the façade  are the six Ionic columns, which carry a small dome.

For the interior design, G. Henry used many elements commonly found in French buildings and hotels. The large and impressive reception hall is a central feature around which all other rooms are grouped.

History 
In 1902 the castle was almost completely destroyed by a fire, but was immediately rebuilt. 
During World War II the castle was surprisingly not seized by German troops. At the end of the war, in the year 1945, the castle was deliberately hit by a German V1 rocket. Many rooms were badly damaged because of that attack. Between 1960 and 1962 the castle was completely restored with the support of the Belgian State and the Count of Liederkercke. Earlier, in 1948, the castle was already declared as a protected monument.

Count Jean-Joseph van der Noot married Florence Ruys Scheeren, Countess of Elissem near Landen. 
One of their children, Louise, got married on April 27, 1803, to Prince Louis de Ligne, son of Charles-Joseph, 7th Prince of Ligne and Princess Franziska of the house of Liechtenstein. They had three children including a son, Eugène, 8th Prince of Ligne (1804–1880), who was a distinguished Belgian statesman. 
After the death of her husband in 1813, Louise married Count Charles d'Outremont, whose family still in possession of the castle. Several times a year the castle can be visited by the public, and it can be rented for weddings.

See also
List of castles in Belgium

External links
Duras Castle, Sint-Truiden Tourist office

References 
 

Castles in Belgium
Castles in Limburg (Belgium)
Buildings and structures completed in 1788
1788 establishments in the Holy Roman Empire
Sint-Truiden